Andreas Stene (born March 1, 1991) is a Norwegian ice hockey player. He is currently playing with the Vålerenga of the Norwegian GET-ligaen.

International
Stene was named to the Norway men's national ice hockey team for competition at the 2014 and 2015 IIHF World Championships.

References

External links

1991 births
Kelowna Rockets players
Living people
Mora IK players
Norwegian ice hockey centres
Sparta Warriors players
Timrå IK players
Vålerenga Ishockey players
Ice hockey people from Oslo